Frailty is a Latvian death-doom metal band from Riga, formed in 2003. They started their career playing concerts on stages of the Latvian metal underground scene. In 2008, the band signed a contract with Russian doom metal label Solitude Productions and released their first album, Lost Lifeless Lights.

Members

Current 
 Edmunds Vizla – guitars, vocals (2003)
 Lauris Polinskis – drums (2006)
 Mārtiņš Lazdāns – vocals (2006)
 Andris Začs – bass (2013); keyboards (2007–2008)
 Jēkabs Vilkārsis – guitars (2011)

Former 
 Artūrs Retenais – bass (2003–2007)
 Juris "Hellhammer" Zilvers – vocals (2004–2005)
 Kārlis Ulmanis – bass (2007–2008)
 Ģirts Fersters – guitars (2003–2010)
 Jānis Jēkabsons – bass (2011–2013) 
 Ivita Puzo – keyboards (2009–2013)
 Iļja Poteškins – guitars (2010)
 Toms Krauklis – bass (2008–2009)
 Alex Makarovs – bass (2009)
 Kaspars Grīnbergs – drums (2004–2006)

Discography 
 Tumši Ūdeņi (LP) (2020)
 Ways of the Dead (LP) (2017)
 Melpomene (LP) (2012)
 Silence Is Everything.. (EP) (2010)
 EP (2009)
 Lost Lifeless Lights (LP) (2008)
 Promo (2007)

References

External links 
 

Doom metal musical groups
Death metal musical groups
Musical groups established in 2003
Latvian heavy metal musical groups